W.A.K.O. European Championships 1986 were the eighth European kickboxing championships hosted by the W.A.K.O. organization arranged by Simon Zahopoulos.  The championships were open to amateur men and women based in Europe with each country only allowed one competitor per weight division.  The styles on offer were Full-Contact (men only) and Semi-Contact kickboxing.  West Germany were easily the strongest nation overall by the end of the championships, with hosts Greece in second and Great Britain third in the medals table.  The event was held in Athens, Greece on Saturday, November 29 to Sunday, November 30, 1986.

Men's Full-Contact Kickboxing

In the men's Full-Contact category at Athens there were ten weight classes ranging from 54 kg/118.8 lbs to over 91 kg/+200.2 lbs, with all of the bouts fought under Full-Contact rules - more detail on Full-Contact rules can be found on the W.A.K.O. website, although they may have changed slightly since 1986.  Notable winners included the ever-present Ferdinand Mack who won his seventh gold at a W.A.K.O. championships (European and World), Michael Kuhr who won his third gold and local fighter Georgios Stefanopoulos who would also go on to have a successful amateur boxing career.  West Germany was the most successful nation in Full-Contact, winning four golds, one silver and one bronze.

Men's Full-Contact Kickboxing Medals Table

Semi-Contact Kickboxing

Semi-Contact differed from Full-Contact in that fighters were won by points given due to technique, skill and speed, with physical force limited - more information on Semi-Contact can be found on the W.A.K.O. website, although the rules will have changed since 1986.  There were fewer weight divisions in men's Semi-Contact when compared to Full-Contact with seven ranging from 57 kg/125.4 lbs to over 84 kg/+184.8 lbs.  As with Full-Contact the top nation in men's Semi-Contact was West Germany who won four golds and two silver medals.

Women's kickboxing had been introduced at the London and Budapest world championships of 1985, but Athens was the first European championships to host women's Semi-Contact.  There were four women's weight divisions ranging from 50 kg/110 lbs to over 60 kg/132 lbs).  By the end of the championships West Germany was the strongest nation in women's Semi-Contact as well, winning two golds, one silver and one bronze medal.

Men's Semi-Contact Kickboxing Medals Table

Women's Semi-Contact Kickboxing Medals Table

Overall Medals Standing (Top 5)

See also
List of WAKO Amateur European Championships
List of WAKO Amateur World Championships

References

External links
 WAKO World Association of Kickboxing Organizations Official Site

WAKO Amateur European Championships events
Kickboxing in Greece
1986 in kickboxing
Sports competitions in Athens